

Qualification system
A total of 680 athletes will qualify to compete at the games. A nation may enter a maximum of two athletes per event, granted they meet the qualification standard. Qualification times and standards can be set from January 1, 2014 to June 28, 2015. The winner of each event contested at the 2014 Pan American Sports Festival will also qualify. Furthermore, a total of sixteen relay teams per each event will also qualify.

Qualification times/standards

Pan American Sports Festival qualifiers
The following athletes qualified by winning the respective event at the 2014 Pan American Sports Festival in Mexico City, Mexico:

Relay qualification
The host nation Canada, along with the United States qualified in each event automatically. The top four teams at the 2014 Central American and Caribbean Games in Veracruz, Mexico along with the top four teams at the 2014 South American Games in Santiago, Chile qualified as well. All other remaining spots were awarded using the ranking lists after the 2015 IAAF World Relays.

Summary

4x100 Men

Venezuela placed in the top four at the 2014 South American Games, and thus only 3 nations qualified through the event. This means 7 nations (instead of 6) will qualify through the rankings.

4x400 Men

Venezuela and Colombia placed in the top four at the 2014 South American Games, and thus only 2 nations qualified through the event. This means 8 nations (instead of 6) will qualify through the rankings.

4x100 Women

Venezuela and Colombia placed in the top four at the 2014 South American Games, and thus only 2 nations qualified through the event. This means 8 nations (instead of 6) will qualify through the rankings.

4x400 Women

Venezuela and Colombia placed in the top four at the 2014 South American Games, and thus only 2 nations qualified through the event. This means 8 nations (instead of 6) will qualify through the rankings.

References

Qualification for the 2015 Pan American Games
Qualification
Pan American Games qualification
Pan American Games qualification